Distomo-Arachova-Antikyra is a municipality in the Boeotia regional unit, Central Greece, Greece. The seat of the municipality is the town Distomo. The municipality has an area of 294.05 km2.

Municipality
The municipality Distomo–Arachova–Antikyra was formed at the 2011 local government reform, according to the programme Callicrates, by the merger of the following 2 former municipalities of Arachova and Distomo and from the former community Antikyra, that became municipal units:
Antikyra 
Arachova 
Distomo

References

External links

Municipalities of Central Greece
Populated places in Boeotia